Rosemary Ann Harris (born 19 September 1927) is an English actress. She is the recipient of such accolades as a Primetime Emmy Award, a Golden Globe Award, and a Tony Award, in addition to nominations for an Academy Award and a BAFTA Award. In 1986, Harris was inducted into the American Theater Hall of Fame. 

Harris began her stage career in 1948, before making her Broadway debut in 1952. For her New York stage work, she is a four-time Drama Desk Award winner and nine-time Tony Award nominee, winning the Tony Award for Best Actress in a Play in 1966 for The Lion in Winter. On television, she won the Primetime Emmy Award for Outstanding Lead Actress in a Limited Series or Movie for the BBC serial Notorious Woman, and the Golden Globe Award for Best Actress – Television Series Drama for the miniseries Holocaust (1978). In film, Harris portrayed Aunt May in Sam Raimi's Spider-Man (2002), Spider-Man 2 (2004), and Spider-Man 3 (2007). For her performance in Tom & Viv (1994), Harris received multiple nominations for the role, including Academy Award for Best Supporting Actress.

Early life
Harris was born on 19 September 1927 in Ashby, Suffolk, the daughter of Enid Maude Frances (née Campion) and Stafford Berkeley Harris. One of her grandmothers was from Kronstadt in the Habsburg Empire (today Romania). Her father was in the Royal Air Force, and as a result, Harris' family lived in India during her early childhood. She attended convent schools, and later studied at the Royal Academy of Dramatic Art from 1951 to 1952.

Career
Early in her acting career, she gained experience in English repertory theatre. In 1948, she acted in Kiss and Tell at Eastbourne and Margate with Tilsa Page and John Clark and later with Anthony Cundell's company at Penzance, where she played the mother in Black Chiffon. She went from Penzance to train at RADA. She first appeared in New York City in 1951 in Moss Hart's Climate of Eden, and then returned to Britain for her West End debut in The Seven Year Itch which ran for a year at the Aldwych.

Harris then entered a classical acting period in productions with the Bristol Old Vic and then the Old Vic, appearing at the latter as Ophelia in the National Theatre Company's opening production of Hamlet in October 1963, alongside Peter O'Toole in the title role. Writing in UK newspaper The Guardian in 2003 as part of a series on landmark theatre productions, playwright Samantha Ellis noted of the National Theatre's opening night: 

Her first film followed, Beau Brummell (1954) with Stewart Granger and Elizabeth Taylor, and then a touring season with the Old Vic brought her back to Broadway in Tyrone Guthrie's production of Troilus and Cressida. She met Ellis Rabb who had plans to start his own producing company on Broadway. By 1959, the Association of Producing Artist (APA) was established, and she and Rabb were married on 4 December of that year.

In 1962, she returned to Britain and Chichester Festival Theatre during its opening season when the director was Laurence Olivier; she appeared as Elena in Olivier's celebrated 1962–63 Chichester production of Uncle Vanya. In 1964, she was Ophelia to Peter O'Toole's Hamlet in the inaugural production of the Royal National Theatre of Great Britain.

Returning to New York, she worked further with the APA, and then was cast as Eleanor of Aquitaine in The Lion in Winter, a performance that garnered her a Tony Award in 1966. Rabb directed her one last time as Natasha in War and Peace in 1967, the same year they agreed to divorce. A little while later, Harris married the American writer John Ehle. The two of them can be heard interviewing prospective candidates, Black public school student candidates for scholarships to all-white private "Segregation academies", on surviving recordings. Ehle was the manager for this Stouffer Foundation program.

Ehle and Harris settled in Winston-Salem, North Carolina, where their daughter, Jennifer, was born in 1969. Jennifer Ehle followed in her mother's footsteps by becoming a noted film, television and Broadway actress.

In 1974, Harris starred in the BBC TV serial Notorious Woman, which aired on PBS in the US as part of Masterpiece Theatre. For this role, she won the 1976 Emmy Award for Outstanding Lead Actress in a Limited Series. She won a Golden Globe Award for Best Actress – TV Drama for the 1978 NBC miniseries Holocaust, which also starred Meryl Streep. Reviewing the BBC's 1983 production of To the Lighthouse, an adaptation of Virginia Woolf's novel of the same name, John J. O'Connor pf The New York Times wrote: "A luminous, flawless performance by Miss Harris makes Mrs. Ramsay as memorable on film as she is on the printed page." She received a Best Supporting Actress Oscar nomination for the 1994 film Tom & Viv. Harris and her daughter Ehle, played the young and elderly incarnations, respectively, of the same character in István Szabó's 1999 film Sunshine, about a Hungarian-Jewish family. They previously played the young and old Calypso in the Channel 4 production of The Camomile Lawn (1992).

Harris appeared in the rotating cast of the Off-Broadway staged reading of Wit & Wisdom. In 2007, she received the North Carolina Award for fine arts. Her husband, John Ehle, won the same award in 1972 for literature.

In 2002, she appeared as Aunt May Parker in the first film adaptation of Spider-Man, reprising the role in the sequels Spider-Man 2 (2004) and Spider-Man 3 (2007).

On 11 September 2018, a week before her 91st birthday, Harris took over the role of Mrs Higgins in the Broadway revival of My Fair Lady from Diana Rigg.

Filmography

Film

Television

Theatre

Video games

Awards and nominations

Film accoladesAcademy AwardBAFTA AwardsGotham AwardsCritics Choice Film AwardsNational Board of ReviewTelevision accoladesPrimetime Emmy AwardGolden Globe AwardsTheatre accoladesTony AwardsDrama Desk AwardLaurence Olivier AwardObie Award'''

References

External links

 
 
 
 Presenting Rosemary Harris website: articles and images
 Rosemary Harris – Downstage Center'' interview at American Theatre Wing.org

1927 births
20th-century English actresses
21st-century English actresses
Alumni of RADA
Best Drama Actress Golden Globe (television) winners
Drama Desk Award winners
Outstanding Performance by a Lead Actress in a Miniseries or Movie Primetime Emmy Award winners
English film actresses
English people of Romanian descent
English stage actresses
English television actresses
English voice actresses
Living people
Obie Award recipients
Special Tony Award recipients
Tony Award winners
English expatriates in the United States
British expatriate actresses in the United States
English Shakespearean actresses